In enzymology, a maleimide hydrolase is an enzyme that catalyzes the chemical reaction

maleimide + H2O  maleamic acid

Thus, the two substrates of this enzyme are maleimide and H2O, whereas its product is maleamic acid.

This enzyme belongs to the family of hydrolases, those acting on carbon-nitrogen bonds other than peptide bonds, specifically in cyclic amides.  The systematic name of this enzyme class is cyclic-imide amidohydrolase (decyclizing). Other names in common use include imidase, cyclic imide hydrolase, and cyclic-imide amidohydrolase (decyclicizing) [misprint].

References

 

EC 3.5.2
Enzymes of unknown structure